The Bissell Hills are a mountain range in the Mojave Desert, in southeastern Kern County, California.

References 

Mountain ranges of the Mojave Desert
Mountain ranges of Kern County, California
Mountain ranges of Southern California